Sakazume (written: 坂詰 or 坂爪) is a Japanese surname. Notable people with the surname include:

, Japanese speed skater
, Japanese actor

Japanese-language surnames